Hell's Gate National Park lies south of Lake Naivasha in Kenya, north west of Nairobi. Hell's Gate National Park is named after a narrow break in the cliffs, once a tributary of a prehistoric lake that fed early humans in the Rift Valley. It was established in 1984. A small national park, it is known for its wide variety of wildlife and for its scenery. This includes the Fischer's Tower and Central Tower columns and Hell's Gate Gorge. The national park is also home to five geothermal power stations at Olkaria. The park is equipped with three basic campsites and includes a Maasai Cultural Center, providing education about the Maasai tribe's culture and traditions.

History 
Hell's Gate National Park is named after a narrow break in the cliffs, once a tributary of a prehistoric lake that fed early humans in the Rift Valley. It received the name "Hell's Gate" by explorers Fisher and Thomson in 1883.

In the early 1900s, Mount Longonot erupted, and ash can still be felt around Hell's Gate. The park was officially established in 1984.

Geography 
 

The park is located  after the turnoff from the old Nairobi-Naivasha highway, and has a warm and dry climate. Olkaria and Hobley's, two extinct volcanoes located in the park, can be seen as well as obsidian forms from the cool molten lava. Within Hell's Gate is the Hells Gate Gorge, lined with red cliffs which contain two volcanic plugs: Fischer's Tower and Central Tower. Off of Central Tower is a smaller gorge which extends to the south, with a path that descends into hot springs that have rocks hot enough to cause burns, and sulfuric water.

Wildlife 
There is a wide variety of wildlife in the national park, though few in number. Examples of little seen wildlife include lions, leopards, and cheetahs. However, the park has historically been an important home for the rare lammergeyer vultures. There are over 103 species of birds in the park, including vultures, Verreaux's eagles, augur buzzard, and swifts. Hyraxes, African buffalo, zebra, eland, hartebeest, Thomson's gazelle, hyena, and baboons are also common. The park is also home to serval and small numbers of klipspringer antelope and Chanler's mountain reedbuck.

Tourism 

The park is popular due to its close proximity to Nairobi and lowered park fees compared to other National Parks. Hiking, bicycling, motorcycling and even camping are encouraged within the park, one of only two Kenyan national parks where this is allowed. The Daily Nation praised the mountain climbing in Hell's Gate as "thrilling." It also recommended the Joy Adamson's Centre and boating on Lake Naivasha. A Maasai Cultural Center provides education about the Maasai tribe's culture and traditions.

The park is equipped with three basic campsites, camping is safe in the park even though there are no guns or fencing between you and wildlife. There are also several lodges around Naivasha Lake, popular among tourists for watersports, bird and game viewing in private ranches and walks along Crescent Island, Crater Lake, and Mt. Longonot.

The main setting of the animated film The Lion King (1994) is heavily modeled after the park, which several of the film's lead crew members had visited in order to study and gain an appreciation of the environment for the film.

The 2003 film Lara Croft: Tomb Raider – The Cradle of Life was shot on location in this park.

Olkaria Geothermal Power Station 

The comprehensive Olkaria Geothermal Station, the first of its kind in Africa, was established in 1981 and generates geothermal power underneath Hell's Gate from the area's hot springs and geysers. Three more geothermal stations were added after 2000: Olkaria II, Olkaria III and Olkaria IV. Construction of the 140MW Olkaria V commenced in 2017 and the plant came online in 2019. As of 2019, a significant part of the Hell's Gate National Park has turned into an industrial area, with many pipelines, power plants and busy tarmac roads.

References

External links 

 Kenya Wildlife Service – Hell's Gate National Park

National parks of Kenya
Geography of Rift Valley Province
Nakuru County
Protected areas established in 1984
1984 establishments in Kenya
Tourist attractions in Rift Valley Province